María Cristina Julio Saldívar (born 17 November 1999) is a Chilean footballer who plays as a midfielder for Santiago Morning and the Chile women's national team.

References 

1999 births
Living people
People from Coquimbo
Chilean women's footballers
Women's association football midfielders
Deportes La Serena footballers
Chile women's international footballers